Petrus Pitarca (died 1622) was a Roman Catholic prelate who served as Bishop of Termia (1617–1622).

Biography
Petrus Pitarca was ordained a priest in the Order of Friars Minor. On 26 June 1617, he was appointed during the papacy of Pope Paul V as Bishop of Termia. On 3 September 1617, he was consecrated bishop by Pietro Aldobrandini, Archbishop of Ravenna, with Attilio Amalteo, Titular Archbishop of Athenae, and Giulio Sansedoni, Bishop Emeritus of Grosseto serving as co-consecrators. He served as Bishop of Termia until his death in 1622. 
While bishop, he was the principal co-consecrator of Gregorius Pedrocca, Bishop of Acqui (1620).

References 

17th-century Roman Catholic bishops in the Republic of Venice
Bishops appointed by Pope Paul V
1622 deaths
Franciscan bishops